Kirton  may refer to:

Places
Kirton, Lincolnshire, (also Kirton in Holland), England
Kirton in Lindsey, Lincolnshire, England
Kirton, Nottinghamshire, England
Kirton, Suffolk, England

People with the surname

Earle Kirton, New Zealand rugby union player (All Black) 
Alfred Kirton, Australian (Victorian) politician 
Andrew Kirton, former General Secretary of the New Zealand Labour Party
Harold Kirton, English cricketer
Colin Kirton, Malaysian actor
Joseph Kirton, Australian (Victorian) politician
Michael John Kirton, occupational psychologist
Nicholas Kirton (born 1998), Canadian cricketer
Rex S Kirton, longtime Mayor of Upper Hutt, New Zealand